The Eye of the Forest is the fifth installment of seven in the Children of the Lamp series.

Summary

Mrs. Gaunt will be going to go to a plastic surgeon djinn named Dr. Kowalski to make Mrs. Gaunt's body look just like her former one. However, djinn can no longer ride whirlwinds safely because of global warming, so she has to fly down to the doctor in Brazil on a regular airplane. Meanwhile, John and Phillipa are invited to a Djinnverso Tournament at Mr. Vodyannoy's house, the Nightshakes.

Meanwhile, Mr. Gaunt is kidnapped while his wife is away by three black druids from near Stonehenge. John and Philippa were at Mr. Vodyannoy's other house when that happened. They meet the butler, Bo. He is sad because his sister Grace was lost in the east wing which is haunted.. Also, no djinn power can be used in this Nightshakes house. John goes to see the talking boards there to try to contact Mr. Rakshasas' spirit, but he awakens an ancient Incan named Manco Capac instead.

He escapes and regains his mummy from a museum. John brings Grace back to her brother and goes to the museum in his ethereal form. Another unrelated thief stole three sacred gold disks and broke somethings, and the news says a thief in Berlin stole an ancient Incan staff. The news then shows a picture of a door shaped like an eye in the Peruvian forests that leads to...nowhere.

Nimrod says that it's the Eye of the Forest and leads to a place that could cause the end of the world. They fly down to Peru after consulting with Faustina, the Blue Djinn, and getting the one copy of the map to the Eye in the world. They bring Zadie Eloko with them. The tour guide is "Sicky," who has a tattoo on his stomach that acts like Medusa. His head is abnormally small due to an accident with enemy Indians when he was young.

They are nearly killed several times by unusually large animals. John later discovers that Zadie is causing it. She was hypnotized by Virgil Macreeby. Zadie accidentally makes a wish that Pizarro would "teach a lesson" to the Indians chasing them. John and Nimrod reach the Eye - the news story was a hoax. The real door is rectangular and tied with a knotted string made from human hair.

John leans against a lupuna tree and gains some of its knowledge. He unties the knot and rescues the others from mummified Indians. Nimrod awakens some Inca kings who go to fight Pizarro's army.  Soon Virgil Macreeby, Dybbuk and Zadie arrive.
They get the disks that Nimrod stole from Zadie. They are intent on using them to make an obviously fake ritual to remake Dybbuk's powers and turn lead to gold.

The three go through the door, keeping back the others by showing them a video that their father is kidnapped. Nimrod connects the dots and realizes that the disks are really polonium, lithium, and steel. The staff has a rod made of pure uranium. These could cause a nuclear explosion. A piece of uranium the size of a baseball destroyed Hiroshima—But if it is bigger (namely the uranium the land is built on) the whole world could blow up. They decide to follow after sending Layla a message through djinnternal mail.

The way to Paititi is guarded by enantodromia (i.e. a wish becomes its opposite). Layla flies to America in a jet at 1500 mph and finds out where Mr. Gaunt is. She rescues him and turns the druids into rare animals. But she shared Edward's body-he is so scared that she renounces her powers(even though Nimrod said in book 2 that you can only renounce once).

Meanwhile, Macreeby leaves Zadie entangled to a human hair bridge that absorbed her and goes on with Buck. John releases her and Nimrod dehypnotizes her. She follows them. While that happens, the other two cross through a row of vampire plants that want their blood. They get across but Macreeby had a concussion. They reach the temple but in the middle of the process realize Macreeby dropped the third gold disk near the plants (the polonium one).

Macreeby gets it but Phil somehow apparates across. Then the plants disappear. Nimrod says her slippers are "gestalt" and that they make her desires come true. They follow to Paititi capturing Macreeby on the way. But just before they reach the city, their electronic devices stop working. Buck dropped the rod without the polonium - there will be no explosion, but only deadly radiation instead.

Phil wishes up a bomb shelter with Hazmat suits. She goes up to find he has split into 2 beings, one good, one bad. The bad one crushes the good one and Phil goes back to the others brokenhearted. They are "gestalted" back to the real world and Phil buries the slippers for fear of their power. Zadie stays behind in the forest to make a school for the Indians.

The bad ones lost their bad chief to Pizarro and are good now. Sicky is their new chief. Macreeby's punishment is that he stays behind to help Zadie. Nimrod plants accelerated growth lupuna trees made by Faustina near the Eye and makes them invisible so loggers don't cut them. When they grow up tall in a few years (they grow 10 times as fast as other lupunas) whirlwind travel will be safe again. The team heads home to New York, with their family back to normal

References

 P.B. Kerr's website
 Scholastic website

Children of the Lamp
2009 American novels
Orchard Books books